Mórichida is a village in Győr-Moson-Sopron county, Hungary.
The north-western part of Hungary, the Little Plain, the Marcal and Raba valley away. 
Right bank of the River Marcal.

Sights
 St. Jacob church (1251)
 Lutheran church (1789)
 Vineyards (1814)
 Nature: Rába, Marcal, Kaszalapi Lake

Born in Mórichida
 Fehér Dániel (Nagymórichida–Tekepuszta, 1890. – Sopron, 1955.) Forest engineer, microbiologist, plant physiologist, botanist.

External links 
 Street map 

Populated places in Győr-Moson-Sopron County